Lady Wolgyeongwon of the Pyeongsan Bak clan was the daughter of Bak Su-mun who became the 28th wife of Taejo of Goryeo. Her aunt became his 26th wife and her cousin became his 29th wife.

References

External links
월경원부인 on Encykorea .

Year of birth unknown
Year of death unknown
Consorts of Taejo of Goryeo
People from North Hwanghae